Norway is a city in Benton County, Iowa, United States. The population was 466 at the time of the 2020 census. It is part of the Cedar Rapids Metropolitan Statistical Area. Norway is the setting of the movie The Final Season.

History
Norway was platted in 1863 by Osman Tuttle (born Osmund Endreson Totland in Hjelmeland, Norway) two years after the Chicago and Northwestern Railway had reached this part of the county.  Tuttle donated five acres of ground to the railway company with the condition that the new town should bear the name of his native country. During 1864,  Tuttle laid out the town site north of the railway truck, which he had recorded as Norway.

Geography

Demographics

2010 census
As of the census of 2010, there were 545 people, 243 households, and 146 families living in the city. The racial makeup of the city was 98.0% White, 0.6% African American, 0.4% Native American, 0.2% Asian, 0.2% from other races, and 0.7% from two or more races. Hispanic or Latino of any race were 0.4% of the population.

There were 243 households, of which 26.3% had children under the age of 18 living with them, 45.7% were married couples living together, 8.6% had a female householder with no husband present, 5.8% had a male householder with no wife present, and 39.9% were non-families. 36.2% of all households were made up of individuals, and 11.9% had someone living alone who was 65 years of age or older. The average household size was 2.24 and the average family size was 2.92.

The median age in the city was 41.2 years. 23.1% of residents were under the age of 18; 5% were between the ages of 18 and 24; 25.6% were from 25 to 44; 26.8% were from 45 to 64; and 19.6% were 65 years of age or older. The gender makeup of the city was 49.9% male and 50.1% female.

2000 census
As of the census of 2000, there were 601 people, 241 households, and 173 families living in the city. The racial makeup of the city was 99.00% White, 0.50% African American, 0.50% from other races. Hispanic or Latino of any race were 0.17% of the population.

There were 241 households, out of which 32.8% had children under the age of 18 living with them, 60.2% were married couples living together, 9.5% had a female householder with no husband present, and 28.2% were non-families. 25.7% of all households were made up of individuals, and 8.3% had someone living alone who was 65 years of age or older. The average household size was 2.49 and the average family size was 3.01.

26.1% are under the age of 18, 6.8% from 18 to 24, 29.1% from 25 to 44, 24.1% from 45 to 64, and 13.8% who were 65 years of age or older. The median age was 37 years. For every 100 females, there were 93.2 males. For every 100 females age 18 and over, there were 93.9 males.

The median income for a household in the city was $44,018, and the median income for a family was $50,278. Males had a median income of $36,103 versus $20,917 for females. The per capita income for the city was $20,300. About 4.3% of families and 5.1% of the population were below the poverty line, including 9.6% of those under age 18 and 5.3% of those age 65 or over.

Education
Students from Norway attend the Benton Community School District. 

Prior to 1991, students attended Norway High School, notable for its baseball athletic program (the subject of the feature film The Final Season). The Norway school district merged into the Benton district on July 1, 1995.

Infrastructure
The Union Pacific Railroad runs on the edge of town.

Notable people
 Mike Boddicker - Former MLB player 
 Bruce Kimm - Former MLB player, coach, and manager
 Hal Trosky - Former MLB player

References

Cities in Benton County, Iowa
Cities in Iowa
Cedar Rapids, Iowa metropolitan area
Norwegian-American culture in Iowa
Populated places established in 1863
1863 establishments in Iowa